Tony Melrose (born 7 September 1959) is an Australian former professional rugby league footballer who played in the 1980s and 1990s. He played in the NSWRL Premiership for Parramatta, South Sydney, Manly-Warringah and Eastern Suburbs in the New South Wales Rugby League (NSWRL) competition.

Melrose began his footballing career playing rugby union. He was captain of the Australian Schoolboys rugby union team and was a member of the team's undefeated tour of Great Britain in 1977. In that Schoolboys squad were the likes of the Ella Brothers Mark, Glen and Gary, as well as future dual international Michael O'Connor and future Australian Kangaroos captain Wally Lewis. He played for the Parramatta Two Blues, New South Wales Waratahs and six tests for The Wallabies as a five-eighth before switching to rugby league in 1980 at the age of twenty.

Melrose was selected to represent New South Wales as a winger for game II of the 1982 State of Origin series, scoring two goals from three attempts.

After two seasons with Parramatta, Tony Melrose moved to Souths where he was the Rabbitohs leading point scorer in 1982 with 186 points (8 tries, 79 goals), and again in 1983 with 154 points (2 tries, 69 goals). He then spent two seasons at Manly under the coaching of Bob Fulton before moving to Easts from 1986–1989.

Melrose retired from playing league after the 1989 NSWRL season, having played 182 first grade games (20 with the Eels, 50 with Souths, 39 with Manly and 73 with Easts). He scored a total of 32 tries (4, 10, 7 and 11 with each respective club) and kicked 298 goals (18, 148, 61 and 71).

After retiring from league, Melrose eventually returned to union in 1992, playing with Gordon RFC.

References

Footnotes
 

1959 births
Living people
Australia international rugby union players
Australian rugby union players
Australian rugby league players
New South Wales Rugby League State of Origin players
Parramatta Eels players
South Sydney Rabbitohs players
Manly Warringah Sea Eagles players
Manly Warringah Sea Eagles captains
Sydney Roosters players
Rugby league centres
Rugby league five-eighths
Rugby league players from Sydney
Rugby union players from Sydney
Rugby union fly-halves